Kristina Buch (born 18 January 1983) is a German artist, based in Düsseldorf and London.

Biography 
Kristina Buch has a degree in Biology and studied Protestant Theology, before she did her M.A. at the Royal College of Art.., in London. She later attended Kunstakademie Düsseldorf and became Meisterschüler with Rosemarie Trockel. In 2012 she was the youngest participating artist at dOCUMENTA (13). In 2013 she graduated from Kunstakademie Düsseldorf and became assistant professor to Carolyn Christov-Bakargiev at Johann Wolfgang Goethe-Universität Frankfurt am Main. She works as visiting lecturer at HGK Basel, where she became the first holder of the 'Next Society' professorship in 2015.

Work 
 Before the I was folded (2009) - Installation into which Buch integrated the first ever sculpture made by a group of chimpanzees. With this work the discourse about ape culture and the question of art beyond the human context was critically relaunched within the contemporary art discourse.
 The Lover (2012) – Installation and 'life-gesture' / over 100 days at dOCUMENTA (13).
 later, Goliath. And then started humming (2013) – Candy paintings, reminiscent of paintings by Kasimir Malevitch and Barnett Newman, appear in different international collections of modern painting until they have been licked away. 
 untitled (holes) (2014) - a one-off concert in cooperation with Iko Birk 
 Some at times cast light (2015) – Through an official council decision, Buch named a public place in Bochum-Ehrenfeld() in Bochum, Germany after a fictitious woman (Grete-Penelope Mars), who deliberately has no biography. A bronze bust of the woman was permanently installed on the site, as well as an official street sign. Every year in June/July, fireflies which have been populated in the adjacent park, temporarily become part of the work.
 Such prophecies we write on banana skins. (triangulation of criminal grace) (2015) – a two-channel HD video projection / soundscape commissioned and produced by 14th Istanbul Biennial. The work suggests an unending major explosion of a landmark art institution on one channel and a complete detonation of Mount Everest on the other channel. In this work Buch expands on a recurring theme in her work, suggesting a necessity for a continued inner dissolution and reconfiguration of images, notions and categories that we tend to create and maintain within human thinking. Buch was the only German artist represented at the 14th Istanbul Biennial.
 It’s normal that reality happens. (these games will fall apart) (2016) - Abstract game field made of white marble lines, laid into the lawn of a public park in Merano, challenging the game/play dichotomy and the drawing of lines and borders at large.
 EXECUTION SEMANTICS for a necessary criminal (2016) - Solo exhibition at Kunsthalle Bremerhaven.
 “One of the things that baffles me about you is that you remain unmurdered.” (2012–2016) 
 OH, BOY! (conjugation of a stick) (2017) 
 Playing above the snake line (2018)

Awards 
 2012 Trieste Young European Artist Award
 2015 Bremerhaven Stipendium
 2019 Großer Hans Purrmann-Preis der Stadt Speyer

External links 

 artist website
 Documenta 13
 Art in America
 SWR interview 2012
 Kölnischer Kunstverein / One of the things that baffles me about you is that you remain unmurdered
 Temporary Gallery
 Mousse Magazine / Iconoclash by tongue
 Monopol / Leck mich!
 Mousse Magazine / untitled (holes)
 Kölnischer Kunstverein / untitled (holes)
 The White Review / holes
 Outset
 Mousse Magazine / Execution semantics for a necessary criminal
 Mousse Magazine / OH BOY! (conjugation of a stick)
 Bundeskunsthalle Bonn / The Playground Project - OUTDOOR

References

Living people
German contemporary artists
1983 births
Artists from Düsseldorf
British contemporary artists